MG-RAST is an open-source web application server that suggests automatic phylogenetic and functional analysis of metagenomes. It is also one of the biggest repositories for metagenomic data. The name is an abbreviation of Metagenomic Rapid Annotations using Subsystems Technology.
The pipeline automatically produces functional assignments to the sequences that belong to the metagenome by performing sequence comparisons to databases in both
nucleotide and amino-acid levels. The applications supply phylogenetic and functional assignments of the metagenome being analysed, as well as tools for comparing different metagenomes. It also provides a RESTful API for programmatic access.

The server was created and maintained by Argonne National Laboratory from the University of Chicago. In December 29 of 2016, the system had analyzed 60 terabase-pairs of data from more than 150,000 data sets. Among the analyzed data sets, more than 23,000 are available to the public.

Currently, the computational resources are provided by the DOE Magellan cloud at Argonne National Laboratory, Amazon EC2 Web services, and a number of traditional clusters.

Background 

MG-RAST has been developed in an effort to have a free, public resource for the analysis and the storage of metagenome sequence data. The service removes one of the primary bottlenecks in metagenome analysis: the availability of high-performance computing for annotating data.

Metagenomic and metatranscriptomic studies involve the processing of large datasets, and therefore they can require computationally expensive analysis. Nowadays, scientists are able to generate such volumes of data because, in recent years, the sequencing costs have reduced dramatically. This fact has shifted the limiting factor to the computing costs:for instance, a recent study of the University of Maryland, estimated a cost of more than $5 million per terabase using their CLOVR metagenome analysis pipeline. As the size and number of sequence datasets continue to increase, costs related to their analysis will continue to rise.

Additionally, MG-RAST also works as a repository tool for metagenomic data. Metadata collection and interpretation is vital for genomic and metagenomic studies, and challenges in this regard include the exchange, curation, and distribution of this information. The MG-RAST system has been an early adopter of the minimal checklist standards and the expanded biome-specific environmental packages devised by the Genomics Standards Consortium, and provides an easy-to-use uploader for metadata capture at the time of data submission.

Pipeline for metagenomic data analysis 

The MG-RAST application offers automated quality control, annotation, comparative analysis and archiving service of metagenomic and amplicon sequences using a combination of several bioinformatics tools. The application was built to analyze metagenomic data, but it also supports amplicon (16S, 18S, and ITS) sequences and metatranscriptome (RNA-seq) sequences processing. Presently, MG-RAST is not capable of predicting coding regions from eukaryotes and therefore it is of limited use for eukaryotic metagenomes analysis.

The pipeline of MG-RAST can be divided into five stages:

Data hygiene 
Includes steps for quality control and artifacts removal. Firstly, low-quality regions are trimmed using SolexaQA and reads showing inappropriate lengths are removed. A dereplication step is included in the case of metagenome and metatranscriptome datasets processing. Subsequently, DRISEE (Duplicate Read Inferred Sequencing Error Estimation) is used to assess the sample sequencing error based on Artificial Duplicate Reads (ADRs) measuring. And finally, the pipeline offers the possibility of screening the reads using Bowtie aligner and removing the reads showing matches close to model organisms genomes (including fly, mouse, cow and human).

Feature extraction 
MG-RAST identifies gene sequences by using a machine learning approach:  FragGeneScan. Ribosomal RNA sequences are identified through an initial BLAT search against a reduced version of SILVA database.

Feature annotation 
In order to identify the putative functions and annotation of the genes, MG-RAST builds clusters of proteins at 90% identity level using the UCLUST implementation in QIIME. The longest sequence of each cluster will be selected for a similarity analysis. The similarity analysis is computed through sBLAT (in which BLAT algorithm is parallelized using OpenMP). The search is computed against a protein database derived from the M5nr, which provides nonredundant integration of sequences from GenBank, SEED, IMG, UniProt, KEGG and eggNOGs databases.

The reads associated to rRNA sequences are clustered at 97% identity. The longest sequence of each cluster is picked as representative and will be used for a BLAT search against the M5rna database, which integrates SILVA, Greengenes and RDP.

Profile generation 
The data is integrated into a number of data products. The most important ones are the abundance profiles, which represent a pivoted and aggregated version of the similarity files.

Data loading 
Finally, the obtained abundance profiles are loaded into the respective databases.

Detailed steps of the MG-RAST pipeline

MG-RAST utilities 

Besides metagenome analysis, MG-RAST can also be used for data discovery. The visualization or comparison of metagenomes profiles and data sets can be implemented in a wide variety of modes; the web interface allows selecting data based on criteria like composition, sequences quality, functionality or sample type and offers several ways to compute statistical inferences and ecological analyses. The profiles for the metagenomes can be visualized and compared by using barcharts, trees, spreadsheet-like tables, heatmaps, PCoA, rarefaction plots, circular recruitment plot, and KEGG maps.

See also
 Metagenomics

References

External links
MG-RAST Web Server
API
MG-RAST manual
M5NR

Molecular biology
Molecular evolution
Metagenomics